Martin Williams may refer to:

Martin Williams (writer) (1924–1992), American music critic
Martin Williams (priest) (born 1937), Welsh archdeacon
Martin Williams (diplomat) (born 1941), former British ambassador 
Martin Williams (environmental scientist) (1947–2020), chemist and environmental scientist
Martin Williams (footballer) (born 1973), English footballer
Martin Lloyd Williams (born 1965), Archdeacon of Brighton and Lewes
Martin Williams (politician) (1858–1934), American politician in the Virginia House of Delegates
Marty Williams (born 1951), American politician

See also
Martin Williams Advertising
Martyn Williams (born 1975), Wales and British Lions international rugby union player